The St Matthias languages are a pair of Oceanic languages spoken on the St. Matthias Islands.

They are a "residual" group of Oceanic languages.

References

 
Languages of Papua New Guinea
Oceanic languages